The 1972 Northern Illinois Huskies football team represented Northern Illinois University as an independent during the 1972 NCAA University Division football season. Led by second-year head coach Jerry Ippoliti, the Huskies compiled a record of 7–4. Northern Illinois played home games at Huskie Stadium in DeKalb, Illinois.

Schedule

References

Northern Illinois
Northern Illinois Huskies football seasons
Northern Illinois Huskies football